In plane geometry the Kovner–Besicovitch measure is a number defined for any bounded convex set describing how close to being centrally symmetric it is. It is the fraction of the area of the set that can be covered by its largest centrally symmetric subset.

Properties
This measure is one for a set that is centrally symmetric, and less than one for sets whose closure is not centrally symmetric. It is invariant under affine transformations of the plane.

Minimizers
The convex sets with the smallest possible Kovner–Besicovitch measure are the triangles, for which the measure is 2/3. The result that triangles are the minimizers of this measure is known as Kovner's theorem or the Kovner–Besicovitch theorem, and the inequality bounding the measure above 2/3 for all convex sets is the Kovner–Besicovitch inequality.  The curve of constant width with the smallest possible Kovner–Besicovitch measure is the Reuleaux triangle.

Computational complexity
The Kovner–Besicovitch measure of any given convex polygon with  vertices can be found in time  by determining a translation of the reflection of the polygon that has the largest possible overlap with the unreflected polygon.

History
Branko Grünbaum writes that the Kovner–Besicovitch theorem was first published in Russian, in a 1935 textbook on the calculus of variations by Mikhail Lavrentyev and Lazar Lyusternik, where it was credited to Soviet mathematician and geophysicist . Additional proofs were given by Abram Samoilovitch Besicovitch and by István Fáry, who also proved that every minimizer of the Kovner–Besicovitch measure is a triangle.

See also
Estermann measure, a measure of central symmetry defined using supersets in place of subsets

References

External links
A Measure of Central Symmetry, Tanya Khovanova's Math Blog, September 2, 2012

Euclidean symmetries